Khodaqoli Qeshlaq (also Romanized as Khodāqolī Qeshlāq; also known as Khodā ‘Alī Qeshlāq) is a village in Sanjabad-e Sharqi Rural District, in the Central District of Khalkhal County, Ardabil Province, Iran. At the 2006 census, its population was 15, in 4 families. The people of the village from Azerbaijan came to this village about 150 years ago. The language of the village is Turkish-Azerbaijani. The customs of this village are very similar to the people of Moghan. This village has such champions as Hossein Gholli (Doodu) and Taghi, Hamdi and Khodagoli at very recent times. The mosque of this village is the shrine of the village and towns near and far. The main occupation of this village is agriculture and animal husbandry. The natural attractions and tourist attractions of this village include Delylik Dash, Kuyil, Kushabulagh, Ardoshidik, Darband and Zirishdik.

References 

Tageo

Towns and villages in Khalkhal County